The 1956 Baylor Bears football team represented Baylor University in the 1956 NCAA University Division football season. The team finished with a record of 9-2 and a victory in the Sugar Bowl against the University of Tennessee. Bill Glass (Guard) was chosen as an All American player and Del Shofner (Halfback) and Jerry Marcontell (End) were selected All Conference.

Schedule

References

Baylor
Baylor Bears football seasons
Sugar Bowl champion seasons
Baylor Bears football